Gašper Marguč (born 20 August 1990) is a Slovenian handball player who plays for Telekom Veszprém and the Slovenian national team.

He represented Slovenia first at the 2012 European Championship, then at the 2013 World Championship and also at the 2016 European Championship.

Honours

Individual
 SEHA League All-Star Team Best Right Winger: 2019–20

References

External links

1990 births
Living people
Sportspeople from Celje
Slovenian male handball players
Expatriate handball players
Slovenian expatriate sportspeople in Hungary
Veszprém KC players